Bilal Moumen (Arabic: بلال مؤمن; born 16 February 1990), also known as Billel Moumen, is an Algerian professional footballer who plays as a midfielder for Championnat National 3 club Bourgoin-Jallieu.

Honours 
MC Alger

 Algerian Championnat National: 2009–10
Algerian Cup runner-up: 2012–13

RC Arbaâ

 Algerian Cup runner-up: 2014–15

References

External links
 

1990 births
Living people
People from Guelma
Algerian footballers
Association football midfielders
Algeria youth international footballers
MC Alger players
USM Bel Abbès players
RC Arbaâ players
ES Ben Aknoun players
WA Boufarik players
FC Bourgoin-Jallieu players
Algerian Ligue Professionnelle 1 players
Championnat National 3 players
Algerian expatriate footballers
Expatriate footballers in France
Algerian expatriate sportspeople in France